Perry Township is one of twelve townships in Delaware County, Indiana. According to the 2010 census, its population was 1,511 and it contained 648 housing units.

History
When Cornelius Van Arsdall, James Lee, William Blunt, David and Aaron Richardson entered the township in April 1820, they had to cut a path wide enough for their wagons. After an ox was killed from the fall of a large oak, when White Beaver, Wapach and Jefferson, who probably belonged to the Delaware tribe, gained their confidence by aiding them.
The township was named for Oliver Hazard Perry, a hero of the War of 1812. The Dr. Samuel Vaughn Jump House was listed on the National Register of Historic Places in 1982.

Geography

Unincorporated towns
 Gates Corner
 Medford
 Mount Pleasant
 New Burlington
(This list is based on USGS data and may include former settlements.)

Adjacent townships
 Liberty Township (north)
 Stoney Creek Township, Randolph County (east)
 Union Township, Randolph County (east)
 Stoney Creek Township, Henry County (south)
 Prairie Township, Henry County (southwest)
 Monroe Township (west)
 Center Township (northwest)

Cemeteries
The township contains two cemeteries: Felton and Mount Pleasant.

References
 United States Census Bureau cartographic boundary files
 U.S. Board on Geographic Names

External links
 Indiana Township Association
 United Township Association of Indiana

Townships in Delaware County, Indiana
Townships in Indiana